Fantômas is a 1946 French crime film directed by Jean Sacha and starring Marcel Herrand, Simone Signoret and Alexandre Rignault.

The context 
The film features the fictional master criminal Fantômas, created in 1911 by Marcel Allain and Pierre Souvestre. The tremendous popular success of the Fantômas novels led to the production of many films based on the series.

A first series of 5 silent films was directed by Louis Feuillade from April 1913 to May 1914. An American version of the serial was produced in the early 1920s. Shortly after the advent of sound, Paul Fejos directed a feature-length Fantômas film which combined elements from the novels and several of Feuillade's films, together with "modernized" plot twists. Two remakes/updates of the Fantômas films were produced in France shortly after the end of World War II (Fantômas, 1946, directed by Jean Sacha, and Fantomas Against Fantomas, 1949, directed by Robert Vernay). In the mid-1960s three films were made in rapid succession starring Jean Marais (of Cocteau's La Belle et la Bête) in the double role of Fantômas and Fandor.

Plot 
Fantômas, once thought dead, has just prevented the marriage of his daughter Hélène with the journalist Fandor, killing the mayor who was to unite them. Then he poses an ultimatum to the Minister of the Interior: he demands a billion in gold, else a million Parisians will die. Inspector Juve decides to hide Hélène and Fandor with Arthur, a former villain in whom he has confidence. Meanwhile, Lady Bentham, anxious to prevent Fantômas from committing new crimes, telephones to Juve the whereabouts of the criminal. Fandor, overhearing the conversation, follows Juve to the hideout, but is trapped by the villain. Juve soon finds him while investigating at Lord Grimsay’s, where Fantômas has settled. Both men, however, manage to escape while Hélène in turn falls into the clutches of the criminal.

Fantômas destroys his secret laboratory before disappearing, then continues to assassinate passersby at random with his death ray. Following Burette, one of Fantômas' accomplices, Juve and Fandor locate the new criminal lair in the catacombs, but after killing Lady Beltham, Fantômas flees once more, taking Hélène hostage. Fandor manages to free the girl while the truck which Fantômas had boarded explodes on a mined bridge.

Fandor and Hélène finally get married but Juve, their witness, doubts the death of
the Prince of Terror.

Cast
 Marcel Herrand: Fantômas
 Simone Signoret: Hélène
 Alexandre Rignault: le commissaire Juve
 André Le Gall: Fandor
 Yves Deniaud: Arthur
 Françoise Christophe: la princesse Daniloff
 Georges Gosset: Burette
 Renaud Mary: Germain
 Lucienne Le Marchand: Lady Beltham
 Paul Faivre: le chauffeur
 Pierre Labry: M. Paul
 Robert Moor: Professeur Cauchard
 Denise Kerny: l'adjointe
 Marcel Lestan: Théo
 Paul Amiot: le directeur de la Sûreté
 Jacques Dynam: le préparateur
 Raymonde La Fontan: la standardiste
 Frédéric Mariotti: un ouvrier

References

Bibliography
 Hardy, Phil (ed.). The BFI Companion to Crime. Continuum, 1997.
 Hayward, Susan. Simone Signoret: The Star as Cultural Sign. Continuum, 2004.

External links
 

1946 films
French crime films
1940s French-language films
Fantômas films
Remakes of French films
Sound film remakes of silent films
1946 crime films
French black-and-white films
1940s French films